Max Q, or Max Q: Emergency Landing, is a 1998  science fiction television film.

Plot summary

The US Space Shuttle Endeavour is launched into space to release a new satellite. An explosion occurs and the crew has to find a way to get back to Earth without atmospheric pressure (max q) crushing the damaged shuttle.

References

External links
Variety
 

1998 films
1998 television films
1998 science fiction films
American aviation films
American science fiction television films
Films about astronauts
Films scored by Nick Glennie-Smith
American space adventure films
1990s American films